Hillview College is a government-assisted Presbyterian secondary school situated on the foothills of the Northern Range at the top of El Dorado Road in Tunapuna, Trinidad and Tobago. The motto Humani Nihil Alienum, which is adapted from a famous quotation by Roman African playwright Terence, means 'Nothing concerning humanity is alien to me'. Expressed in a positive way it means, 'I am interested in everything concerning mankind'. 

It is an all-boys school (girls have been admitted to 6th Form since 1992, however) and is a seven-year school that prepares students for CSEC/O-Level Examinations at the 5th Form and CAPE/A-Level Examinations at the 6th Form. It offers education in the areas of the sciences, business studies and modern studies. In 2011 The Hillview College Senior Cricket Team swept all three titles in InterCol Secondary Schools Cricket League.

History
In July 1951 the Official Board of the Aramalaya Presbyterian Church appealed to the Presbyterian of the Canadian Mission Church for a Boys' Secondary School to be sited on Sheriff Street, Tunapuna.

Two years later the Naparima College Board, which was governing only the Canadian missionary Secondary Boys' School in the country at the time, was instructed by the Presbytery to proceed with plans for a programme of secondary school expansion, giving priority to the oilfield area and the area in the vicinity of Tunapuna.

A committee of missionaries agreed to release buildings on Sheriff Street for use and on 27 September 1954 application was made to the Colonial Government for the recognition of a Provisional Assisted Secondary School in Tunapuna.

On Monday, 17 January 1955 the school was opened under the principalship of Rev. H. F. Swann. It was called Naparima College, Tunapuna Branch, with an enrollment of 44 students and two teachers. The church hall on Sheriff Street was used as the classroom and the portion of the grounds and cow-shed were used for games and also for teaching as a classroom ( the cow - shed that is).

Naparima College, Tunapuna Branch remained on this site until September 1957. In this year the Principal, staff and students entered the present site at the top of El Dorado Road. In November 1957 the government granted the college Permanent Status as a Government Assisted Secondary School and in 1962 the next principal, Dr. Stephen Moosai-Maharaj, renamed the school to Hillview College and gave it its motto and composed the words for the college song.

In 1959 the science laboratories were built, and the number of classrooms increased. In 1967 the main hall was extended to accommodate the increased number staff, and an extension was made in 1996 to create offices for the administration and clerical staff. In 1986 a library was built and named in honour of Mr. Stephen R. Seepersad (Principal 1975-1988). In 1993 a 6th Form block was built, and in 1999 a pavilion was constructed and named in honour of Mr. Richard Kokaram (Principal 1989-1999).

In 2005, Amrik Singh Kochhar placed first in the world in Mathematics, Further Mathematics and fourth in Physics in the Cambridge A-level examinations winning Hillview College their President's Gold Medal for the fourth time. Hillview continues to obtain scholarships in the CXC CAPE examinations.

However, cricket is not the only thing that Hillview is most renowned for as the Hillview College football team called the H.V.C. Spartans, spearheaded by Mr. Sievan Siewsarran has been demolishing other football teams in intercol (inter - college) tournaments from the day that Mr. Siewsarran has begun coaching the team.
Victorious InterCol 2011 Cricket Team: - Hillview College became the first North East Zone school to win the PowerGen Secondary Schools Cricket League and swept all other major competitions.

Faculty
As a denominational school, Hillview College is under the jurisdiction of the Presbyterian Secondary Schools' Board of Education. The Board is appointed every two years and oversees the progress and development of the five Presbyterian schools in the country. Hillview College has its own Board of Management which is responsible for the day-to-day management of the school. It approves the school budget, looks after other financial matters and the maintenance of grounds and buildings.

Members of staff are appointed on the recommendation of the Presbyterian Secondary Schools Board of Education.

There are five Deans, a Dean of Studies, and ten Heads of Department who assist the Principal and Vice Principal in the administration of the school.

A librarian and library Assistant, four laboratory assistants, a bursar, a secretary, an office Assistant, ten ancillary staff and four security guards complete the quota of staffing at Hillview College.

The Student Council 
As a means of training students to thrive within a democracy, Hillview College has founded its own internal "government", the Student Council. A school wide election is carried out, in which the students vote digitally for a nominee of their choice for President, Vice President and Secretary. These positions are filled by members of Lower Six. Their role is to ensure that the needs and wants of the students are heard, and further conveyed to the relevant authorities. Beyond this however, each class holds an internal election to elect two class representatives. These representatives will then serve to present the issues of their class during the fortnightly Student Council meeting.

A rigid system of prefects has also been implemented. Like the Student Council heads, prefects must be members of Form Six. Every prefect is assigned to supervise a form class.

Co/Extra Curricular Activities 
It is without doubt that Hillview College's curriculum focuses on the holistic development of individuals. One of the ways by which this is achieved is through co-curricular and extra-curricular activities. A few of the most active clubs and organizations are listed below.

Astronomy Club 
The astronomy club was re-established in 2018 by students Ashvin Ramkissoon (President) and Samir Ali (Vice-President). It is currently headed by President and Captain, Ryker Harricharan. The club engages students with captivating presentations and discussions about aerospace and space exploration. This club is an exemplar of the success at Hillview College. They won the National Astronomy Quiz in 2016 and 2018, and Hillview College has facilitated meetings of the Trinidad and Tobago Astro Club (TTAC) since 2019.

Hillview College Film and Photography Club 
Founded in 2013, the Film and Photography Club has been one of the most popular, and well known aspects of Hillview. Within its time of existence, the Club has hosted five photography exhibitions and three film festivals. Its members have won awards nationally in recognition of their work, including Josiah Persad, whose short film,‘Sweat’ won the best short film and people's choice award for the 2016 National Film Festival. The Club's activities focus on developing the creative digital arts of students and promoting the image of the school.

The Club is currently overseen by members of staff Mr. Stephen Bedase and Ms. Michelle Tappin-Davis.

Hillview Biological Organisation (HBO) 
Students of Hillview College generally outperform those of other schools in the science subjects. It is without a doubt, then, that Hillview has a traditionally science-based club - The Hillview Biological Organisation. The Club, founded in 2013, focuses on activities based on biology, and social science. Students of the Club participate in various humanitarian exercises such as volunteering at animal shelters, assisting the dogs on campus, donating towards families in need in the Tunapuna area, and school cleanups.

HBO is currently overseen by member of staff Ms. Ria Rodriguez.

Hillview Journalism Society 
Founded in 2014 by Dari Maharaj and Euan Ramnarine, and reinvigorated in 2019 by Dylan Kowlessar and Naveen Boodoo, is Hillview's Journalism Society. The activities of the club focus on documenting notable events of the school, as well as providing a forum for students to edit, grow, source, and harness report and aesthetic writing. The Club also features articles on fun facts, club activities.

Leading the Journalism Society is member of staff Mrs. Alana Ramlal.

Literary and Debating Society 
Led by Co-Presidents, Nathan Nancoo and Justin Sookdeo, this society aims to engage the students of Hillview College in healthy and productive debating, while sensitizing them to current events and pressing issues. The club's aim is to aid students in learning to express their views appropriately, as required in the work place or any other public forum. 

Leading this club is also Mrs. Alana Ramlal.

HVC Engineering Team 
Every year, accredited international engineering bodies including IMechE and IStructE host design and build competitions to give budding engineers various opportunities to explore the engineering field. Students of Hillview College are always eager to showcase their talents in designing, and knowledge of form and function in these competitions. One notable achievement is 3rd Place School in 2018 IMechE PCG Design and Build Competition where students were required to construct a self-propelled vehicle.

This team is facilitated by members of staff, Mr. Shane Baldeosingh, Mr. Ron Ramsingh and Mrs. Asha Parasram-Paltoo.

HVC Spartan Knights Chess Team 
Members of the chess club undergo intense training in the sport of chess to become a part of the exceptional team and earn the title 'Spartan Knight'. This team is led into battle by Captain Samir Ali (2018-2020) where they emerged victorious in several tournaments. These included the following:

13th Annual Secondary Schools Chess Championship TT Chess Academy & Promotions & First Citizens Bank Secondary Schools Chess Championship. (2nd place school)

SJC POS Secondary School Chess Tournament. (1st place school)

First Citizens’ Bank (FCB) 14th Trinidad & Tobago (T&T) National Annual Secondary Schools Chess Championship. (2nd place school)

This club is facilitated by member of staff, Mr. Sievan Siewsarran and Coach, Mr. Dev Soondarsingh.

HVC Spartan Swim Team 
Hillview College dominates the Secondary School arena in the field of competitive swimming. Since 2014, this outstanding team has only come second once, to Fatima College. Do note however, that it was by a hair strand of a division. They normally attain first place in every swim meet. 

The team is coached by the exceptional ex-Hillview College teacher, Mr. Sterling Manchouk.

Principals 
 Rev. Harold F. Swann - 1955-1957
 Rev. Isaac Kirkpatrick - 1957-1962
 Dr. Stephen Moosai-Maharaj - 1962-1969
 Mr. Stephen Alisharan - 1969-1975
 Mr. Stephen Seepersad - 1975-1988
 Mr. Richard Kokaram - 1988-2000
 Mr. Jeremiah Seepersad - 2000-2007
 Mr. Leslie Mahase - 2007–2020
 Mr. Derek Bissessar -  2020-Present

Notable alumni 
 Richard Kelly - Member of Trinidad and Tobago National Cricket Team
 Leon Romero - Member of Trinidad and Tobago and USA National Cricket Teams
 Carlyle Mitchell - Defender for Vancouver Whitecaps FC & Member of Trinidad and Tobago National Football Team
 Anthony Garcia - Former Minister of Education
 Esmond Forde - Member of Parliament for Tunapuna
 Kevin Ramnarine - Former Minister of Energy

See also 
 List of schools in Trinidad and Tobago

References 

 Hillview College Student Manual
 Old Boys' Association : Dinesh Martin (for providing the image)
 trinidadexpress.com

External links 
 
 Hillview College Blogspot, defunct
 Old Boys' Association Past students association
 Presbyterian Church in Trinidad and Tobago  (Parent Church)

Schools in Trinidad and Tobago
Presbyterian schools in Trinidad and Tobago